Advena campbelli is a species of air-breathing land snail, a terrestrial pulmonate gastropod mollusk in the family Helicarionidae. This species is endemic to Norfolk Island. It was listed as extinct by the International Union for the Conservation of Nature from 1996. However, the Australian Government lists the species as Critically Endangered, and stated in 2009 that the species' IUCN status was "incorrect and requires updating." A small living population was found in 2020.

References

Advena (gastropod)
Extinct gastropods
Gastropods described in 1834
Taxa named by John Edward Gray
Taxonomy articles created by Polbot